Gabrielsen Natatorium is a swimming and diving facility at the University of Georgia (UGA) in Athens, Georgia, U.S.A. The natatorium is home to the university's varsity swimming and diving programs and seats almost 2,000 spectators.

History
The facility was dedicated in 1996 and is named after B.W. Gabrielsen, the head coach of the team from 1948 to 1966. In 1999 and 2006, the pool hosted the NCAA Women's Swimming and Diving Championships. The pool also hosted the NCAA Men's Swimming and Diving Championships in 2002 and the USA Diving World Championship Trials in 2003.

Facility
The natatorium is housed within the Ramsey Center, the student physical activity center at UGA. The natatorium has three separate pools: a 50-meter competition pool (844,000 gallons of water) with two movable bulkheads; a diving pool (525,000 gallons of water) with two 1-meter springboards, two 3-meter springboards, five diving platforms (1, 3, 5, 7.5 and 10-meters), and an air sparger system; an instructional and recreational pool (130,000 gallons of water) that is 25-yards long with eight swimming lanes.

Notes

References
Official Georgia Bulldogs facilities page for Gabrielsen Natatorium
University of Georgia Athletics UGA official Athletic dept
GeorgiaDogs.com official UGA sports site

Sports in Athens, Georgia
Sports venues completed in 1996
Sports venues in Georgia (U.S. state)
University of Georgia campus
Buildings and structures in Athens, Georgia
College swimming venues in the United States
Georgia Bulldogs swimming and diving